Yishanzhen ( Chinese :宜 山镇) is a town in China.  It is located in Zhejiang Province , in the eastern part of the country, about 310 kilometers south of the provincial capital Hangzhou . The population is 56,008. population is 26,805 women and 29,203 men. Children under 15 years make up 16.0%, adults 15-64 years 77%, and older people over 65 years 6.0%.

Around Yishanzhen it is densely populated, with 762 inhabitants per square kilometer.  nearest major community is Jinxiang , 11.5 km southeast of Yishanzhen. The area around Yishanzhen consists mostly of agricultural land .

The average annual rainfall is 2,019 millimeters. The wettest month is June, with an average of 275 mm of rainfall , and the driest is January, with 66 mm of rainfall.

References 

Cangnan County
Township-level divisions of Zhejiang